Andrée Chedid                           (20 March 1920 – 6 February 2011), born Andrée Saab Khoury, was an Egyptian-French poet and novelist of Syrian/Lebanese descent. She is the recipient of numerous literary awards and was made a Grand Officer of the French Legion of Honour in 2009.

Life
Chedid was born in Cairo, Egypt, on 20 March 1920 to a Lebanese Christian family. She was the daughter of Selim Saab, a Maronite Christian born in Baabda, Lebanon and Alice Khoury who was born in the Greek Orthodox community of Damascus and from a Lebanese family from Baabda as well. 

When she was 10 years old, she was sent to a boarding school, where she learned English and French. At 14, she left for Europe. She then returned to Cairo to go to the American University. Her dream was to become a dancer. 

When she was 22, she married Louis Selim Chedid, a Lebanese physician from a Maronite bourgeois family in Cairo and former research director at the National Center for Scientific Research, honorary professor of the Institute Pasteur and author of several books such as The heart remains and Babel which he wrote with his wife Andree.  

Both her son Louis Chedid and her grandson Matthieu Chedid, also known as -M-, are popular pop and rock singers in France. She contributed song lyrics to her grandson including that of Bonoboo on the 1999 album Je dis aime. Her granddaughter Émilie Chedid (born in 1970) is a French director, Joseph Chedid (born in 1986), also known by his stage name of Selim, is a French singer and Anna Chedid (born in 1987), also known by her stage name of Nach, is also a French singer.

Literary work 
Andrée Chedid published her first collection of poems On the Trails of my Fancy in 1943 in Cairo. She settled in Paris with her husband in 1946 and began writing there. In addition to numerous poems and novels, she also wrote plays and children's books mainly published by the publisher Groupe Flammarion . Her poetry books were partly illustrated by the Luxembourg painter Roger Bertemes .

In 1972, Chedid received the Prix de l'Aigle d'or for poetry followed by numerous other literary awards. For her books Fraternité de la parole and Cérémonial de la violence in 1976 she was awarded the Prix Mallarmé . 

Her best-known work is novel L'Autre which has been translated into many languages and tells of the rescue from an earthquake spilled by an ancient Egyptian. It was made into a movie in 1991 by Bernard Giraudeau under the title L'Autre. 

Andrée Chedid was also awarded the Grand Prize of the Société des Auteurs et Compositeurs Dramatiques, the Grand Prize of the Société des auteurs, compositeurs et éditeurs de musique (SACEM) in 1999 and the Prix Goncourt of poetry.

Chedid has written twenty-three volumes of poetry, eighteen novels, more than a hundred short stories, eight plays and nine children's books.

Legacy 
In an appraisal, French President Nicolas Sarkozy called her part of a "generation of cosmopolitan intellectuals who chose France as their new home after the war, helping the country to a literary renaissance".

Her work questions human condition and what links the individual to the world. Her writing seeks to evoke the Orient, but she focuses more in denouncing the civil war that destroys Lebanon. She lived in France from 1946 until her death. Because of this diverse background, her work is truly multicultural. Her first book was written in English: On the Trails of my Fancy. She has commented about her work that it is an eternal quest for humanity.

She died on 6 February 2011 in Paris at the age of 90.

In 2012, a public library was named for her, in Paris.

Tribute 
Several schools in France bear her name: in Rennes, in the Villejean district, in Anstaing (North) and in Aigrefeuille-sur-Maine 9 (Loire-Atlantique). 

The library of Villemoisson-sur-Orge (Essonne) carries her name as well as the media libraries Tourcoing, La Seyne-sur-Mer (Var), La Meilleraie-Tillay (Vendée) and the libraries of Beaugrenelle (15 th arrondissement of Paris) and Alizay 11 (Eure).

Awards and honours

 1966 Louise Labe prize
 1975 Grand Prize of French Literature from the Royal Academy of Belgium

 1976 Mallarmé prize 
 1979 Prix Goncourt de la Nouvelle, Le Corps et le Temps
1989 Prix Culture et Bibliothèques pour tous, L'Enfant multiple
1990 Grand prix de poésie de la SGDL literary award
1990 Gutenberg Prize (France)
1994 Grand prix de littérature Paul-Morand (for her entire work)
1996 Albert Camus Prize
2001 Prix Louis-Guilloux, The Message
 2002 Prix Goncourt de la Poésie
 2009 Grand Officier de la Légion d'honneur

Selected works 

 Le sixième jour (The sixth day), Paris 1960, made into the movie The Sixth Day (1986) by Youssef Chahine with Dalida in the lead role
 The Other , Roman, Flammarion, Paris 1969, made into a movie in 1991 by Bernard Giraudeau for which he was nominated for a César Award 
 Painted words or the moth has no mane , Mahnert-Lueg, Munich 1979,  (translated from the manuscript)
 Behind the Faces , Flammarion, Paris 1984, 
 La femme de Job , narrative, 1992
 Beloved Earth , Poem, Alpha Press, Sulzbach 2006

Works

À la mort, à la vie: nouvelles. Paris: Flammarion, 1992.
L'Autre: roman. Paris: Flammarion, 1969.
Cavernes et soleils: poésie. Paris: Flammarion, 1979.
Cérémonial de la violence. Paris: Flammarion, 1976.
La Cité fertile: roman. Paris: Flammarion, 1972.
Le Dernier candidat. Paris: Éditions théâtrales Art et comédie, 1998
Le Message. Paris: Éditions Flammarion, 2000
L'Enfant multiple. Paris: Flammarion, 1989.
La Maison Sans Racine. Paris: Flammarion, 1985.
Le Sommeil délivré. Paris: Flammarion, 1952.
Le Grand Boulevard.Paris :Flammarion,1996

References

 "Une grande romancière, mère et grand-mère (A Grand Author, Mother and Grandmother)"
 Biography

External links
 Prix Chronos de Littérature

1920 births
2011 deaths
Writers from Cairo
French people of Lebanese descent
20th-century French novelists
21st-century French novelists
Egyptian emigrants to France
Prix Goncourt de la Poésie winners
Lebanese women short story writers
Lebanese short story writers
French women poets
20th-century French women writers
Lebanese women poets
The American University in Cairo alumni
Prix Louis Guilloux winners
Prix Goncourt de la nouvelle recipients
Grand Officiers of the Légion d'honneur
Burials at Montparnasse Cemetery
20th-century French poets
French women novelists
21st-century French women writers